Ivan Rohach (29 May 1913 – 21 February 1942) was a Ukrainian journalist, poet, writer, and political activist born in Velykyi Bereznyi, Ung county, Austria-Hungary (modern-day Ukraine).

From 1933 to 1938, he was the editor of the Novoyi Svobody newspaper in Uzhhorod, in Carpathian Ruthenia, then part of Czechoslovakia and today in western Ukraine. Between 1938 and 1939, he was the personal secretary to rev. Avhustyn Voloshyn, the nominal Prime-Minister of Carpatho-Ukraine during its several days of independence in March 1939 before it was occupied by Hungary following the First Vienna Award. Rohach was an active supporter and member of the Ukrainian scouting movement, Plast.

Political career
Rohach was a prolific writer of political pamphlets and short stories dealing with various aspects of religion, human morality, the nationality question, and the cause for Ukrainian self-determination.
He was a member of the Organization of Ukrainian Nationalists (OUN) and an avid supporter of the Andriy Melnyk faction. He moved to Kyiv during the German occupation in order to aid in the re-establishment of a Ukrainian administration in the nation's capital. In January 1942, Rohach became the co-editor of the Nove Ukrainske Slovo ('New Ukrainian Word') newspaper and the magazine "Lytavry" (Tympani), which united those active in Ukrainian culture and arts in the Ukrainian capital.

Arrest and execution
In 1941, Rohach was arrested by the Gestapo for publicly voicing and publishing a negative opinion regarding the treatment of Jews and psychiatric patients by the Nazis . He was taken to Babi Yar where, along with his sister, Anna (Hanna), and his entire staff, Rohach was executed.

Legacy

Poems from his collection of poetry "Brosti" have been set to music. A number of the songs have been included in the Plast song book "U mandry" (To wander) and continue to be sung by Ukrainian scouts today.

In 1992, a wooden cross memorial was erected in memory of Olena Teliha and executed OUN members. It is located in Babi Yar south of Yuriia Illienka Street (formerly until 2018 Melnyk/Melnykov Street) at Oleny Telihy Street in northwestern part of Kyiv near Dorohozhychi subway station. Rohach's name is the 6th from the top on the right side marble plaque.

References 

Entsykolpedia Ukrainoznavstva  Vol 7 p. 2547
ПОДІЇ НА ЗАКАРПАТТІ ДО 30 ВЕРЕСНЯ 1938 РОКУ at exlibris.org.ua
Щоденник Частина 5. Василь Ґренджа-Донський. Щастя і горе Карпатської України at litopys.org.ua
Трагедия Бабьего Яра: массовые казни людей нацистами (1941—43) at www.kmv.gov.ua

1913 births
1942 deaths
People from Zakarpattia Oblast
Czechoslovak writers
Ukrainian murder victims
Organization of Ukrainian Nationalists
People murdered in Reichskommissariat Ukraine
Ukrainian people executed by Nazi Germany
20th-century Ukrainian journalists
Czechoslovak journalists